Placer Union High School District  is a public school district based in Placer County, California, United States.

The district serves the following cities and unincorporated communities:
Alta
Auburn
Colfax
Dutch Flat
Foresthill
Granite Bay
Lincoln
Loomis
Meadow Vista
Newcastle
North Auburn
Penryn
Rocklin

References

External links
 

School districts in Placer County, California
Auburn, California